In Greek mythology, Thiasus or Thiasos (Ancient Greek: Θίασός means 'Bacchic revel, rout') may refer to:

 Thiasus, one of the leaders of the satyrs who joined the army of Dionysus in his campaign against India.
 Thiasus, the ecstatic retinue of Dionysus.

Notes

References 

 Nonnus of Panopolis, Dionysiaca translated by William Henry Denham Rouse (1863-1950), from the Loeb Classical Library, Cambridge, MA, Harvard University Press, 1940. Online version at the Topos Text Project.
 Nonnus of Panopolis, Dionysiaca. 3 Vols. W.H.D. Rouse. Cambridge, MA., Harvard University Press; London, William Heinemann, Ltd. 1940–1942. Greek text available at the Perseus Digital Library.

Satyrs
Dionysus in mythology